Franklin Street Arts Collective is an art gallery, art collective, and non-profit organization located in Chapel Hill, North Carolina. Franklin Street Arts Collective is commonly called FRANK. FRANK features a wide variety of art by local and regional artists including painting, mixed media, ceramics, furniture, jewelry, and sculpture.  FRANK is a contemporary fine arts gallery, featuring work by local artists and enriching the community through exhibitions, events, and arts education.

References

Art museums and galleries in North Carolina
Chapel Hill-Carrboro, North Carolina